Roger Mathis may refer to:
Roger Mathis (footballer, born 1921) (1921–2015), Swiss footballer
Roger Mathis (footballer, born 1986), Swiss footballer